Obinna Eze (born June 12, 1998) is an American football offensive tackle for the Detroit Lions of the National Football League (NFL). He played college football at Memphis and TCU.

Early life and high school
Eze migrated to the United States in 2015. Initially a basketball player, he did not start playing football until arriving in the US.

College career
Eze was a highly-ranked OT recruit, and received scholarship offers from many SEC schools. He eventually committed to Memphis prior to his senior year of high school.

Professional career

Eze went undrafted in the 2022 NFL Draft, but was signed on May 13, 2022 ahead of Lions training camp. His quest to make the 53-man roster, along with other players', was featured on the HBO television show Hard Knocks. During the 2022 preseason, though not starting, he appeared in 31 snaps against the Falcons, 22 snaps against the Colts, and 23 snaps against the Steelers.

Eze was waived on August 30, as part of final roster cuts, but signed to the practice squad the next day. He signed a reserve/future contract on January 9, 2023.

Personal life
Eze's parents still live in Nigeria. He has four siblings. He is married to Yasmeen Eze.

References

External links
 Detroit Lions bio
 TCU Horned Frogs bio
 Memphis Tigers bio

1998 births
Living people
American football offensive tackles
Detroit Lions players
Memphis Tigers football players
TCU Horned Frogs football players
Nigerian players of American football
Players of American football from Nashville, Tennessee